The 1981–82 season was the 83rd completed season (84th overall) of The Football League.

Overview
Three points for a win was introduced for the first time in England. Champions Aston Villa finished a disappointing 11th but made up for this by triumphing in the European Cup at the first attempt.

Liverpool made up for the previous season's slip in league form by winning the league championship for the 13th time in their history, fighting off competition from Ipswich Town, Manchester United and Spurs. Liverpool also won the Football League Cup for the second season in succession. The league triumph was made all the more significant by the fact that they had occupied 10th place on Christmas Day.

Their season of triumph was overshadowed, however, by the death of legendary former manager Bill Shankly, 68, following a heart attack in late September.

Middlesbrough and Wolves were relegated as financial problems at both clubs began to mount. They were joined by Leeds United, only seven years after playing in the European cup final.

West Bromwich Albion felt the loss of manager Ron Atkinson and key players Bryan Robson and Remi Moses as they slumped to 19th in the league and narrowly avoided relegation. This was just the beginning of a sharp decline for a club who three seasons earlier had reached the UEFA Cup quarter-finals and almost won the league title.

Swansea City were tipped for relegation by most observers as they reached the First Division for the first time in their history, having just completed their third promotion in four seasons. But John Toshack's men had a brilliant first game in the top flight, crushing Leeds United 5-1 and setting the tone for a season which would end with Leeds going down. Swansea, meanwhile, were the most unlikely title contenders, topping the league at several stages of the season before finishing sixth in the final table.

Manchester United paid a British record fee of £1.75million for West Bromwich Albion's 24-year-old England midfielder Bryan Robson. Robson's record-breaking move reflected on how the size of transfer fees had risen dramatically in a relatively short period of time. Less than four years earlier, the British record fee had been the £516,000 that West Bromwich Albion had paid for David Mills. In such a short amount of time, the British record had more than tripled.

Everton, who had struggled in the league for the past few seasons, turned to their former player Howard Kendall and appointed him as manager in hope of restoring the club to its former glory.

Final league tables and results

The tables and results below are reproduced here in the exact form that they can be found at The Rec.Sport.Soccer Statistics Foundation website, with home and away statistics separated.

During the first five seasons of the league, that is, until the season 1893–94, re-election process concerned the clubs which finished in the bottom four of the league. From the 1894–95 season and until the 1920–21 season the re-election process was required of the clubs which finished in the bottom three of the league. From the 1922–23 season on it was required of the bottom two teams of both Third Division North and Third Division South. Since the Fourth Division was established in the 1958–59 season, the re-election process has concerned the bottom four clubs in that division.

First Division

The First Division title race saw many teams take the lead throughout the season, including traditional favourites like Manchester United, Manchester City, Tottenham Hotspur and Arsenal, as well as thriving Ipswich Town and Southampton, and most incredibly a Swansea City side who had never been in the First Division before, and who had been in the Fourth Division just a few seasons previously. In the end, however, it was Liverpool who clinched the title after a surge in the second half of the campaign which took them from mid table at Christmas to clinching the title on the final day of the season. They also retained the League Cup. Defending champions Aston Villa only finished mid-table but finished the season as European Cup winners, three months after Ron Saunders stood down as manager and was succeeded by his assistant Tony Barton.

Wolves went down to the Second Division for the second time in seven seasons, while Middlesbrough went down after eight years in the First Division. Leeds United, who had gradually lost touch with the First Division's elite since Don Revie left in 1974, lost their top flight status after 18 years.

Other memorable events of the season included the early season transfer of Bryan Robson from West Bromwich Albion to Manchester United for a national record £1.5million, and the death of legendary former Liverpool manager Bill Shankly.

Final table

Results

Managerial changes

Maps

Second Division
Luton Town clinched the Second Division as their cosmopolitan side ended the club's seven-year exile from the First Division, joined by runners-up Watford (in the First Division for the first time under inspirational manager Graham Taylor) and a Norwich City side who had surged from 10th place to the final promotion place during the final quarter of the campaign. Sheffield Wednesday, QPR and Leicester City just missed out on promotion, as did two surprise contenders still yet to play in the First Division - Barnsley and Rotherham United.

Cardiff City, Wrexham and Orient were relegated; the latter two have not returned to this level since.

Joe Royle, the 33-year-old former Everton striker, began his managerial career at Oldham Athletic.

Final table

Results

Maps

Third Division
Burnley, Carlisle United and Fulham enjoyed some success after a string of disappointments by winning promotion to the Second Division.

Going down were Wimbledon, Swindon Town, Bristol City and Chester. Bristol had completed a unique succession of three relegations, while Swindon had been League Cup winners little over a decade earlier. Wimbledon, meanwhile, would not be enduring any more disappointing season for many years after 1982.

Results

Maps

Fourth Division

Sheffield United began the first phase of their revival by winning the Fourth Division championship, which marked a superb start to the management career of Ian Porterfield. Also promoted were Bradford City, Wigan Athletic and Bournemouth.

Crewe Alexandra endured a terrible season and propped up the league with just 27 league points, but the other league members voted in their favour and they maintained their league status.

Results

Maps

Election/Re-election to the Football League
This year Runcorn, the winners of the Alliance Premier League, could not apply for election because they did not meet Football League requirements. 2nd placed Enfield could not apply either for the same reasons, so 3rd placed Telford United won the right to apply for election to the Football League to replace one of the four bottom sides in the 1981–82 Football League Fourth Division. The vote went as follows:

As a result of this, all four Football League teams were re-elected, and Telford United were denied membership of the League.

See also
 1981-82 in English football

References

Ian Laschke: Rothmans Book of Football League Records 1888–89 to 1978–79. Macdonald and Jane’s, London & Sydney, 1980.

 
English Football League seasons